Captain (Retd.) Pandit Jagat Vir Singh Drona (born 23 July 1939) is the former mayor of Kanpur and a former member of the 10th,11th and 12th Lok Sabha.
He belongs to the Bharatiya Janata Party. He served in the Indian army before joining politics in 1990.

Positions held

1990–1992		President, Bharatiya Janata Party (B.J.P.),		District. Kanpur
1991		Elected to 10th Lok Sabha
1991–1996		Member, Consultative Committee, Ministry of Steel
1993		Deputy Chief Whip, B.J.P. Parliamentary Party, Lok Sabha onwards
1993–1995		Member, Committee on Public Accounts
1993–1996		Member, Rules Committee
1994–1996		Member,  Committee on Defence,		Member,  Committee on Steel
1996		Re-elected to 11th Lok Sabha (2nd term)
1996–1997		Member, Committee on Estimates;	Member, Committee on Home Affairs; Member, Consultative Committee, Ministry of Defence
1997		Member, Joint Parliamentary Committee, Wakf Board
1998   		Re-elected to 12th Lok Sabha (3rd term),		Secretary, B.J.P. Parliamentary Party
1998–1999		Member, Committee on Transport and Tourism	Member, Joint Committee on the Empowerment of Women	and its Sub-Committee on Appraisal of Laws relating to		Women - Criminal Laws Member, Consultative Committee, Ministry of Railways
2012–2017         Hon'ble Mayor of Kanpur

References

Mayors of Kanpur
Bharatiya Janata Party politicians from Uttar Pradesh
Living people
1939 births
Indian Army personnel
India MPs 1991–1996
India MPs 1996–1997
India MPs 1998–1999
Lok Sabha members from Uttar Pradesh
Politicians from Kanpur